The 1983 IAAF World Cross Country Championships was held in Gateshead, England, at the Riverside Park on March 20, 1983.   A report on the event was given in the Glasgow Herald and in the Evening Times.

Complete results for men, junior men, women, medallists, 
 and the results of British athletes were published.

Medallists

Race results

Senior men's race (11.994 km)

Note: Athletes in parentheses did not score for the team result

Junior men's race (8.033 km)

Note: Athletes in parentheses did not score for the team result

Senior women's race (4.072 km)

Note: Athletes in parentheses did not score for the team result

Medal table (unofficial)

Note: Totals include both individual and team medals, with medals in the team competition counting as one medal.

Participation
An unofficial count yields the participation of 431 athletes from 35 countries, one senior man athlete less than the official number published.

 (13)
 (14)
 (18)
 (20)
 (6)
 (2)
 (1)
 (8)
 (3)
 (20)
 (15)
 (21)
 (20)
 (4)
 (17)
 (9)
 (5)
 (6)
 (14)
 (15)
 (20)
 (11)
 (1)
 (21)
 (5)
 (21)
 (11)
 (21)
 (15)
 (8)
 (11)
 (6)
 (21)
 (21)
 (7)

See also
 1983 IAAF World Cross Country Championships – Senior men's race
 1983 IAAF World Cross Country Championships – Junior men's race
 1983 IAAF World Cross Country Championships – Senior women's race
1983 in athletics (track and field)

References

External links
The World Cross Country Championships 1973-2005
GBRathletics
Athletics Australia

 
World Athletics Cross Country Championships
C
Iaaf World Cross Country Championships, 1983
Sport in Gateshead
International athletics competitions hosted by England
20th century in Tyne and Wear
Cross country running in the United Kingdom